Route 216 is a two-lane east/west highway in Quebec, Canada, which starts in Sainte-Catherine-de-Hatley in the Estrie region at the junction of Route 108 and ends in Sainte-Perpétue in Chaudière-Appalaches at the junction of Route 204.

Route 216 follows mostly a northeast/southwest course, and it is not a busy highway as it mostly links small villages between themselves in the backroads of the Appalachians. The only two major towns along the way are Sherbrooke and Sainte-Marie. Between Ham-Nord (junction with Route 161) and Saint-Jacques-le-Majeur-de-Wolfestown (junction with Route 263), the road is unpaved.

Municipalities along Route 216
 Sainte-Catherine-de-Hatley
 Sherbrooke
 Stoke
 Saint-Camille
 Wotton
 Saint-Adrien
 Ham-Nord
 Saint-Jacques-le-Majeur-de-Wolfestown
 Saint-Julien 
 Irlande 
 Saint-Adrien-d'Irlande
 Saint-Jean-de-Brébeuf 
 Kinnear's Mills 
 Saint-Jacques-de-Leeds 
 Saint-Sylvestre 
 Saint-Elzéar 
 Sainte-Marie 
 Sainte-Marguerite
 Saint-Malachie 
 Saint-Nazaire-de-Dorchester
 Notre-Dame-Auxiliatrice-du-Buckland
 Saint-Philémon
 Saint-Paul-de-Montminy 
 Sainte-Apolline-de-Patton 
 Saint-Marcel
 Sainte-Félicité
 Sainte-Perpétue

See also
 List of Quebec provincial highways

References

External links 
 Provincial Route Map (Courtesy of the Quebec Ministry of Transportation) 
 Route 216 in Google Maps

216
Transport in Sherbrooke